Licince is a village and municipality in Revúca District in the Banská Bystrica Region of Slovakia.

External links
https://web.archive.org/web/20080111223415/http://www.statistics.sk/mosmis/eng/run.html 

Počet obyvateľov: 711 
Rozloha: 1830 ha 
Prvá písomná zmienka: v roku 1263 
Starosta: Ladislav Miklóš (ehm..chh)

Villages and municipalities in Revúca District